Norman Hill Reservoir is a reservoir in the Piethorne Valley in the Metropolitan Borough of Rochdale, within Greater Manchester, England.

References

Reservoirs in Greater Manchester